Kentucky supplemental roads and rural secondary highways are the lesser two of the four functional classes of highways constructed and maintained by the Kentucky Transportation Cabinet, the state-level agency that constructs and maintains highways in Kentucky. The agency splits its inventory of state highway mileage into four categories:
The State Primary System includes Interstate Highways, Parkways, and other long-distance highways of statewide importance that connect the state's major cities, including much of the courses of Kentucky's U.S. Highways.
The State Secondary System includes highways of regional importance that connect the state's smaller urban centers, including those county seats not served by the state primary system.
The Rural Secondary System includes highways of local importance, such as farm-to-market roads and urban collectors.
Supplemental Roads are the set of highways not in the first three systems, including frontage roads, bypassed portions of other state highways, and rural roads that only serve their immediate area.

The same-numbered highway can comprise sections of road under different categories. This list contains descriptions of Supplemental Roads and highways in the Rural Secondary System numbered 1500 to 1999 that do not have portions within the State Primary and State Secondary systems.



KY 1508

Kentucky Route 1508 is a  rural secondary highway in southern Union County. The highway begins at KY 109 in the village of Grangertown west of Sturgis. The highway heads west and receives the west end of Old Providence Road, which leads to KY 923. KY 1508 heads west along the northern edge of the Big Rivers Wildlife Management Area and State Forest to Caseyville, where the route turns north and runs along the Ohio River. KY 1508 crosses an unnamed stream and passes the Union County Boat Ramp on its way to Mulfordtown, where the road veers away from the river. At Dekoven, the highway runs concurrently with KY 492 north to the latter highway's terminus at KY 667. KY 1508 continues northeast to its terminus at KY 109.

KY 1531

Kentucky Route 1531 is a  rural secondary highway that begins in northeastern Bullitt County and ends in northwestern Shelby County, but the route spends almost all of its length in the city of Louisville in eastern Jefferson County. The highway begins at KY 1319 (Kings Church Road) near Whitfield. KY 1531 heads northwest along Dawson Hill Road then turns northeast onto Routt Road to enter the city of Louisville and Jefferson County. The highway crosses Wheelers Run and Back Run and meets the eastern end of KY 1819 (Brush Run Road) south of the Routt neighborhood of Louisville. KY 1531 follows Sheckels Run to its crossing of Cane Run and reaches KY 155 (Taylorsville Lake Road) south of Fisherville. The highway runs concurrently with KY 155 northwest across Floyds Fork of the Salt River to KY 148 (Taylorsville Road), with which the route heads east through Fisherville and across Floyds Fork again.

KY 1531 splits north from KY 148 onto Eastwood Fisherville Road, which crosses another Brush Run and passes under a Norfolk Southern Railway line. The highway crosses Shakes Run and Long Run and passes under I-64 with no access on its way to Eastwood, where the highway intersects KY 2841 and US 60 (Shelbyville Road). KY 1351 continues on Johnson Road, which parallels and then intersects an R.J. Corman Railroad Group line and passes to the east of Valhalla Golf Club. The highway crosses a third Brush Run and briefly follows a bend of Floyds Fork. KY 1351 veers northeast onto Aiken Road at the junction with that county road and reaches its northern terminus at KY 362, which heads west on Ash Avenue and northeast on Aiken Road, just north of the Jefferson–Shelby county line.

KY 1533

Kentucky Route 1533 is a  rural secondary highway in northern Allen County. The highway begins at KY 234 (Cemetery Road) north of Settle and heads east as Meador Port Oliver Road. KY 1533 crosses Little Difficult Creek, intersects KY 101 (Smiths Grove Road) at Meador, and crosses Difficult Creek. The highway reaches its east end at KY 252 (Barren River Dam Road) south of the dam that impounds the Barren River to create Barren River Lake.

KY 1575

Kentucky Route 1575 is a  urban secondary highway in the city of Somerset in Pulaski County. The west-east highway begins at KY 2227 and travels east intersecting KY 1247 before terminating at KY 39. It is known as University Drive for its entire length.

KY 1580

Kentucky Route 1580 is a  rural secondary highway in the city of Somerset in Pulaski County. The west-east highway begins at KY 1247 and travels east until the end of state maintenance.

KY 1583

Kentucky Route 1583 (KY 1583) was a  state highway in Ohio County. It followed Horse Branch Loop. The highway traveled through the main area of Horse Branch and ended at U.S. Route 62 (US 62). KY 1583 was given to Ohio County on March 1, 2021.

KY 1651

Kentucky Route 1651 is a  rural secondary highway in southern and central McCreary County. The highway runs between a pair of intersections with US 27 near Pine Knot and Marshes Siding, between which the highway runs concurrently with KY 92 in Stearns and serves Whitley City, the unincorporated county seat of McCreary County. KY 1651 begins at a four-legged intersection with US 27 and KY 92, which run concurrently from Pine Knot to Stearns, and KY 2792. KY 1961 heads southwest to Southern Highway, onto which the route turns north and continues south as a county highway through the center of Pine Knot. The highway meets the eastern end of KY 3251 (Round Top Road) and parallels the Norfolk Southern Railway to Revelo, where the route crosses to the west side of the railroad and meets the eastern end of KY 742. KY 1961 meets the northern end of KY 741 and crosses the Big South Fork Scenic Railway, also part of the Kentucky and Tennessee Railway, immediately before it turns east onto its concurrency with KY 92 in Stearns.

KY 1651's splits north from KY 92 just west of that highway's bridge across the railroads. The highway passes through the Stearns Administrative and Commercial District and by the historic Stearns Golf Course. North of the village center, KY 1651 meets the eastern ends of KY 3259 (Winchester Road) and KY 701 (Poplar Springs Road) and passes by the Stearns ranger station of Daniel Boone National Forest. The highway crosses over the Norfolk Southern Railway and meets the northern end of KY 2278 (Ball Cemetery Road) at the south end of Whitley City. KY 1651 meets the western ends of KY 478 (Williamsburg Street) and KY 3253 (Cora Cooper Road) and crosses back to the west side of the railroad. The highway intersects KY 700 in Marshes Siding and crosses over the railroad again before reaching its northern terminus at US 27.

KY 1667

Kentucky Route 1667 is a  supplemental road in eastern Shelby County. The highway extends from the state maintenance boundary, from which Boat Dock Road continues south to serve Guist Creek Lake, north to KY 1779 (Benson Pike) east of Shelbyville.

KY 1721

Kentucky Route 1721 is a  rural secondary highway north of the city of Somerset in rural Pulaski County. The west-east highway begins at KY 1247 and travels east until the end of state maintenance as a continuation as Estesburg Road.

KY 1749

Kentucky Route 1749 is a  rural secondary highway in northeastern Warren County and southwestern Edmonson County. The highway begins at KY 185 just south of its bridge over the Green River. KY 1749 heads northeast along Glenmore Road through Glenmore to the Warren–Edmonson county line just south of the river. The highway, now named Wingfield Church Road, approaches the Green River again to cross Little Beaverdam Creek at its confluence with the Green River. The highway heads south away from the Green River and approaches the Warren–Edmonson county line before reaching its terminus at KY 743 (Chalybeate School Road) south of Nick.

KY 1767

Kentucky Route 1767 is a 0.18 mi (0.28 km) supplemental road in Owensboro that runs in a North/South direction on the portion of Hawes Boulevard between KY 2830 and U.S. 60.

KY 1770

Kentucky Route 1770 is a  rural secondary highway in eastern Lincoln County. The highway begins at US 150 (John Sims Highway) east of Rowland. KY 1770 follows Old US 150 southeast to KY 3177, which continues east on Old US 150 while KY 1770 turns south onto Old Ottenheim Road. The highway crosses Walnut Flat Creek and Boone Creek and curves east through Sugar Grove. KY 1770 crosses a branch of Cedar Creek and Cedar Creek itself, which here forms an arm of Cedar Creek Lake. The highway passes southeast of William Whitley House State Historic Site before reaching its eastern terminus at KY 643 just west of that highway's intersection with US 150 southwest of Crab Orchard.

KY 1779

Kentucky Route 1779 is a  rural secondary highway in eastern Shelby County. The highway follows Benson Pike beginning at the named road's eastern intersection with KY 1871 (Cranbourne Grange) east of Shelbyville. KY 1779 crosses an arm of Guist Creek Lake and meets the northern end of KY 1667, which provides boating access to the lake. The highway passes to the north of the Thomas Threlkeld House and by the Thomas Weakley House and the Graham House. KY 1779 intersects KY 395 (Elmburg Road) south of Bagdad next to a mysterious historic commercial building only referred to as the Building at Jct. of KY 395 and 1779. The highway meets the northern end of KY 1472 (Mink Run Road) and curves northeast toward the village of Hatton. There, KY 1779 crosses the Dutch Fork of North Benson Creek, part of the Kentucky River watershed. The highway has an oblique grade crossing of a R.J. Corman Railroad Group rail line and reaches its eastern terminus at KY 1005 (Vigo Road) at the Shelby–Franklin county line.

KY 1785

Kentucky Route 1785 is a  rural secondary highway in northeastern Todd County and northwestern Logan County. The highway begins at KY 181 (Greenville Road) north of Tyewhoppety. KY 1785 follows Jason Ridge Road, which passes close to but does not cross the Todd–Muhlenberg County county line, east through Jason to the Todd–Logan county line. The highway continues southeast along Lake Malone Road across Lake Malone through the community of Whispering Pines to the route's eastern terminus at KY 1293 (Dunmor Deer Lick Road).

KY 1790

Kentucky Route 1790 is a  rural secondary highway in eastern Shelby County. The highway begins at KY 53 (Mount Eden Road) at the east city limit of Shelbyville south of KY 53's partial cloverleaf interchange with I-64. KY 1790 heads east along Hooper Station Road, which crosses Guist Creek, part of the Salt River watershed, and meets the western end of KY 2866 (Woodlawn Road). The highway crosses over I-64 and has a grade crossing of a join CSX Transportation–Norfolk Southern Railway rail line at Hooper. KY 1790 passes the historic William Sleadd Farm before reaching its eastern terminus at KY 714 (Hemp Ridge Road).

KY 1827

Kentucky Route 1827 is a  rural secondary highway in northeastern Edmonson County and western Hart County. The highway begins at the entrance to Nolin Lake State Park, which fronts the eastern shore of Nolin River Lake, an impoundment of the Nolin River. KY 1827 follows Brier Creek Road southeast to KY 728 (Nolin Dam Road) at Straw. The route runs concurrently with KY 728 through an intersection with KY 1015 (Union Light Road). KY 1827 splits east from KY 728, which curves northeast along Gap Hill Road, southeast of Straw. The highway heads east along Cub Run Road, which meets the northern end of KY 1352 (Stockholm Road) north of Stockholm. KY 1827 passes through Bee just east of the Edmonson–Hart county line before heading northeast along Cherry Springs Road to its terminus at KY 728 (Gap Hill Road) south of Cub Run.

KY 1846

Kentucky Route 1846 is a  rural secondary highway that passes through Horse Cave in southern Hart County. The highway begins at the Hart–Barren county line south of Horse Cave. KY 1846 heads north along Old Glasgow Road. The highway passes through the east side of the city of Horse Cave, where the highway intersects KY 218 (Main Street). KY 1846 continues north from KY 218 along Short Cut Road to the highway's northern terminus at US 31W.

KY 1851

Kentucky Route 1851 is a  state highway in Louisville in Jefferson County. The highway begins at KY 1450 and heads north to the end of state maintenance.

Major intersections

KY 1854

Kentucky Route 1854 is a  rural secondary highway in eastern Hart County. The highway begins at KY 88 (Hardyville Road) between Munfordville and Hardyville. KY 1854 follows Boyds Knob Road east to the highway's terminus at US 31E at Canmer.

KY 1883

Kentucky Route 1883 is a  rural secondary highway in eastern Owen County. The highway begins at KY 607 (New Columbus Road) west of Natlee, from which KY 1883 heads north along Slatin Road. The highway meets the western end of KY 2018 (Swope Natlee Road) and follows the named road across Caney Creek, a tributary of Eagle Creek, to the east end of KY 3103, which continues along Swope Natlee Road while KY 1883 continues northwest on Hammond School Road. KY 1883 crosses Richland Creek and has a staggered intersection with KY 845 (Breck Road) at Breck. The highway continues on Elk Lake Resort Road, which crosses Elk Creek and passes to the north of the namesake lake community before the route reaches its north end at KY 330 east of Hallam.

KY 1896

Kentucky Route 1896 is a  rural secondary highway in northern Boyle County. The highway begins at US 127 (Harrodsburg Road) just south of the Boyle–Mercer county line. KY 1896 heads east along Faulkner Lane, which crosses Mock Branch of the Dix River. The highway passes through Faulconer, which is just north of a wye of Norfolk Southern Railway lines. KY 1896 intersects the line to Louisville near Mocks Branch and the line to Lexington and Cincinnati in the center of Faulconer. The highway reaches its eastern terminus at KY 33 (Shakertown Road) east of Faulconer.

KY 1922

Kentucky Route 1922 is a  rural secondary highway in northeastern Shelby County and southeastern Henry County. The highway begins at KY 12 (Bagdad Road) in Jacksonville. KY 1922 heads north along Cedarmore Road. Near the Shelby–Henry county line, the highway curves west and crosses Sixmile Creek, a tributary of the Kentucky River. KY 1922 reaches its northern terminus at US 421 (Castle Highway) at Defoe just north of the county line.

KY 1925

Kentucky Route 1925 is a  rural secondary highway in southern Boone County. The highway begins at KY 338 (Beaver Road) next to the Dr. John E. Stevenson House, Big Bone Methodist Church, and Big Bone Lick State Park at Big Bone. KY 1925 follows Big Bone Road northeast and north past the William Milburn Glore House and the Thomas Huey Farm to its terminus at KY 536 (Hathaway Road) at Hueys Corners. The Kentucky Transportation Cabinet established KY 1925 through a May 4, 1987, official order.

KY 1929

The southern terminus is at the end of state maintenance at Buckhorn Creek Road southeast of McDowell and the northern terminus is at KY 680 east of McDowell.

KY 1956

Kentucky Route 1956 is a  rural secondary highway with portions in Pulaski and Rockcastle counties but that is mostly in Laurel County. The highway begins at KY 80 at Squib in eastern Pulaski County. KY 1956 heads northeast through Daniel Boone National Forest along Old London Road along Lacy Fork of Line Creek; the highway crosses Line Creek at its confluence with the fork. The highway continues northeast into the southern extremity of Rockcastle County, where the highway meets the southern end of KY 1249 (Sand Springs Road). KY 1956 turns southeast and crosses the Rockcastle River into western Laurel County at Billows. The highway follows Somerset Road and exits the national forest at Bernstadt. KY 1956 meets the northern ends of KY 1535 (Sinking Creek Road) and KY 1035 (Pine Top Road) and the south end of KY 2041 (Glenview Road) before reaching its eastern terminus at KY 80 (Russell Dyche Memorial Highway) at the west city limit of London west of KY 80's interchange with I-75. The Kentucky Transportation Cabinet established KY 1956 along the old course of KY 80 through a December 22, 1982, official order after KY 80's present course west of London was completed.

KY 1967

Kentucky Route 1967 is a  rural secondary highway in eastern Woodford County. The highway begins at KY 169 (Pinckard Pike) north of Pinckard. KY 1967 follows Shannon Run Road north by the William Garrett House and the Humphries Estate Quarters through a junction with KY 1966 (Military Pike) to US 60 (Lexington Road) near Gaybourn between Versailles and Lexington. The highway continues north from US 60 along Pisgah Pike, which passes through the same-named community at its grade crossing with the Norfolk Southern Railway and passes by the Pisgah Presbyterian Church. KY 1967 passes through the Pisgah Rural Historic District on its way to its northern terminus at KY 1681 (Old Frankfort Pike) near Faywood.

KY 1975

Kentucky Route 1975 is a  rural secondary highway in the city of Lexington in southern Fayette County. The highway begins at KY 1974 (Tates Creek Road), which follows the Fayette–Jessamine county line at the village of Spears. KY 1975 heads northeast along Spears Road to KY 1976 (Jacks Creek Pike), where KY 1975 begins to follow Jacks Creek Pike. The highway continues north along that road to its north end at US 25 (Old Richmond Road).

KY 1982

Kentucky Route 1982 is a  rural secondary highway in western Owen County. The highway begins at KY 355 in Perry Park. KY 1982 heads east along Squiresville Road through Squiresville to its east end at KY 22 (Gratz Road) west of Owenton.

References

State highways in Kentucky
Lists of roads in Kentucky